The State Service for Combatting Economic Crimes is an anti-corruption agency in Kyrgyzstan established by President Almazbek Atambayev.  In a bid to tackle corruption, applicants to jobs at the agency were made to take an examination on live Kyrgyz Television.

References

Politics of Kyrgyzstan
Political organisations based in Kyrgyzstan